Rysbrack, Rijsbrack or Rijsbraeck is a Flemish surname. Notable people with the surname include:

Pieter Rijsbraeck (1655–1729), Flemish painter
John Michael Rysbrack (1694–1770), Flemish sculptor working in Britain, son of Pieter Rijsbraeck
Pieter Andreas Rijsbrack (1685–1748), Flemish painter, son of Pieter Rijsbraeck
Gerard Rijsbrack (1696–1773), Flemish painter, son of Pieter Rijsbraeck

Dutch-language surnames